E. niger may refer to:
 Epicrionops niger, a caecilian amphibian species found in Guyana, Venezuela and possibly Brazil
 Esox niger, the chain pickerel, a freshwater fish species found along the eastern coast of North America

See also
 Niger (disambiguation)